Protein diet may refer to:
High-protein diet
Low-protein diet